The Left may refer to :

Left-wing politics in general or to the following political parties:
the Communist Party of India, sometimes referred to as the Left
 The Left (Czech Republic) or Levice
 The Left (Germany) or Die Linke
 The Left (Italy) or La Sinistra
 The Left (Luxembourg) or Déi Lénk
 The Left (North Macedonia) or Levica
 The Left (Poland) or Lewica
 The Left (Slovenia) or Levica
 The Left (Spain) or La Izquierda
 The Left (Switzerland) or Die Linke, also known as the Alternative Left (Alternative Linke)
 The Left in the European Parliament – GUE/NGL
The Left (band), American hip hop group

See also
 La Gauche (disambiguation)
 Left Party (disambiguation)
 Left Alliance (disambiguation)
 Lewica (disambiguation)